The 2013 ITF Women's Circuit – Sanya was a professional tennis tournament played on outdoor hard courts. It was the third edition of the tournament which was part of the 2013 ITF Women's Circuit, offering a total of $50,000 in prize money. It took place in Sanya, China, on 9–15 September 2013.

WTA entrants

Seeds 

 1 Rankings as of 26 August 2013

Other entrants 
The following players received wildcards into the singles main draw:
  Sun Ziyue
  Tian Ran
  Wang Yafan
  Xu Shilin

The following players received entry from the qualifying draw:
  Hsu Wen-hsin
  Liang Chen
  Tang Haochen
  Zhao Yijing

The following player received entry into the singles main draw as a lucky loser:
  Zhao Di

Champions

Singles 

  Karolína Plíšková def.  Zheng Saisai 6–3, 6–4

Doubles 

  Sun Ziyue /  Xu Shilin def.  Yang Zhaoxuan /  Zhao Yijing 6–7(5–7), 6–3, [10–3]

External links 
 2013 ITF Women's Circuit – Sanya at ITFtennis.com

2013 ITF Women's Circuit
2013
2013 in Chinese tennis